The Kettles on Old MacDonald's Farm is a 1957 American comedy film directed by Virgil Vogel. It is the tenth and last installment of Universal-International's Ma and Pa Kettle series starring Marjorie Main and introducing Parker Fennelly as Pa, replacing Percy Kilbride. It was also Marjorie Main's last movie of any kind.

Plot
Ma and Pa Kettle help Brad Johnson turn his girlfriend Sally into a good farm wife. Wealthy Sally Flemming has fallen in love with an ordinary lumberjack.

Worried her father may oppose the marriage, the couple conceal her on the Kettle farm until he can convince her father that he'd be a suitable breadwinner.

Ma Kettle decides Flemming needs some heavy-duty lessons on how to be a good farm wife. Only Flemming's sense of humor helps her survive the lessons, which include getting up at 4:30AM; being surrounded by livestock; and mastering the use of non-modern appliances. The wedding does take place in the end.

Cast
Marjorie Main as Ma Kettle
Parker Fennelly as Pa Kettle
Gloria Talbott as Sally Flemming
John Smith as Brad Johnson
George Dunn as George
Roy Barcroft as J.P. 'Jim' Flemming
Claude Akins as Pete Logan
Patricia Morrow as Bertha (as Pat Morrow)
George Arglen as Henry Kettle
Ricky Kelman as Elmer
Donald Baker as Abner
Polly Burson as Agnes Logan
Hallene Hill as Granny
Sara Taft as Clarabelle
Harvey B. Dunn as Judge
Boyd 'Red' Morgan as Shivaree Man

See also
 List of American films of 1957

References

External links

1957 films
1957 comedy films
Ma and Pa Kettle
American comedy films
Films scored by Henry Mancini
Films scored by Herman Stein
Films set in Washington (state)
Films set in 1957
1950s English-language films
Films directed by Virgil W. Vogel
1950s American films